This uniform polyhedron compound is a composition of 5 truncated cubes, formed by truncating each of the cubes in the compound of 5 cubes.

Cartesian coordinates 
Cartesian coordinates for the vertices of this compound are all the cyclic permutations of

 (±(2+), ±, ±(2+))
 (±τ, ±(τ−1+τ−1), ±(2τ−1+τ))
 (±1, ±(τ−2−τ−1), ±(τ2+τ))
 (±(1+), ±(−τ−2−), ±(τ2+))
 (±(τ+τ), ±(−τ−1), ±(2τ−1+τ−1))

where τ = (1+)/2 is the golden ratio (sometimes written φ).

References 
.

Polyhedral compounds